Pogragja or Pograxha (Albanian: Pograxhë) may refer to:

Pogragja, Gjilan, a village near Gjilan, Kosovo
, a village near Klina, Kosovo

See also
Podgrađe (disambiguation)